The Mid Valley Times is a weekly newspaper, published on Thursdays, serving Reedley, Dinuba, Sanger, and surrounding communities in Fresno County and Tulare County, California. It was known as the Reedley Exponent until July, 2019, when it merged with the Dinuba Sentinel and the Sanger Herald. At the time of the merger, the Herald was the oldest business in Sanger. The Sanger Herald was founded in 1889, the Reedley Exponent was founded in 1891. It has a current circulation of 3,400 copies and it is edited by Jon Earnest.

The paper is owned by Mid-Valley Publishing Inc. and published by Fred Hall, who runs a far-right political opinion column in the paper.

History

Reedley Exponent
The Reedley Exponent was founded in March 1891 by A.S. Jones. The first edition of the paper was printed in a room at the Knauer home and post office building. It moved to G st the following year; that office burned down and was later rebuilt. The paper was soon owned by W.W. Holland.

John Fairweather, who also an active public political figure, was editor and proprietor of the Reedley Exponent for 20 years, starting in 1896. In 1897, Fairweather started a subscription list for the purpose of helping pay for the rights of way for the Valley road. He passed the paper on to his son, John Henry Fairweather, in 1915. John Henry Fairweather later became vice president of Fresno County Press Association. In 1920, J.H. Fairweather saved two women and a man from drowning.

In 1914, Willie O. Besaw, a local photographer, experimented with self-cancelling stamp designs in the Exponent office. Besaw later applied for a U.S. patent for his design.

In 1922, the paper became known as the Reedley Exponent and Ledger. In 1931, it was renamed back to Reedley Exponent. J.H. Fairweather became postmaster of Reedley in 1933, but remained with the paper.

The first ad for the Model T Ford appeared in the Reedley Exponent in September 1927.

Helen Fairweather Burke published and edited the paper in the 1930s. After then, John Henry Jr., John Henry Fairweather's son, took over the paper until he entered the U.S. Navy after the attack on Pearl Harbor. John Henry Jr.'s brother, James, took over the paper and continued publishing it until 1970.

After publishing the paper for 79 years, the Fairweather family sold the Reedley Exponent to Mr. and Mrs. Glen Hage in 1970.

John McGoff, president of Panax Corp.,purchased the Exponent in 1976. The paper was sold again in 1978 and purchased by Sierra Publishing Company. In 1982, the Exponent became part of Foothill Communications Corporation.

Sanger Herald
The Sanger Herald was founded by E. P. Dewey, only one year after the establishment of the town of Sanger. John Thomas Walton is credited as their first subscriber, as well as the first man to be married in Sanger.

In 1920 Sanger News was consolidated with the Sanger Herald.

In 1935 the Herald was selected as one of the 11 most outstanding weekly newspapers in the United States.

On the 50th anniversary of the publication they put out a 'Golden Jubilee Edition'. The Sanger Herald staff took it upon themselves to research the history of their town's name; it had been rumored that a member of the original town survey party was named Sanger and the town adopted the name upon establishment in 1887. They consulted the Post Office Department in Washington and contacted Alice B. Sanger, daughter of Joseph Sanger Jr. and found out that Sanger was named after Joseph by a group of railroad officials. Joseph Sanger Jr.'s portrait was featured in the Golden Jubilee Edition, marking the first time the citizens of Sanger saw the man their town was named for.

Glenn and Norma Hage purchased the newspaper from editor and owner Seymour Sterling in 1968. The Hages also purchased the Reedley Exponent in 1970. They later sold both papers to John McGoff of Sierra Publishing.

Mid Valley Times
The Exponent struggled to compete with online news sources, and the decision was made to merge the local newspapers of Reedley, Dinuba, and Sanger to consolidate subscribers and cut costs. The merger went into place in July, 2019.

The three papers remain independent only through their separate social media profiles, which take Mid Valley Times articles and distribute them based on interest.

Awards

Reedley Exponent

Gruner Awards

Sanger Herald
Sanger Herald won first place for best investigative reporting in the 2016 Better Newspapers Contest hosted by the California Newspaper Publishers Association.

References 

Weekly newspapers published in California
Mass media in Fresno County, California
Publications established in 1891
1891 establishments in California
Publications established in 1889
1889 establishments in California
San Joaquin Valley